Bradley Allan Grobler (born 25 January 1988) is a South African soccer player who plays as a striker for Premier Soccer League club SuperSport United and the South African national team.

Club career
Grobler attended Benoni High School and plied his trade as a junior at both Boksburg FC and BK Callies just outside Johannesburg. Bradley started his professional football career at Platinum Stars. After a four-year stint at Stars, he moved to Turkish second division side Göztepe A.Ş. on 26 August 2011. He was then Göztepe's most expensive signing ever.

On 26 June 2012, Grobler joined Premier Soccer League side Ajax Cape Town on a four-year deal.

He has scored over 8 goals against Orlando Pirates, while at Supersport United.

International career
Grobler scored on his international debut against Zimbabwe on 15 November 2011.

International goals

Personal life
Born in Sandton, Grobler is the son of former Moroka Swallows player Les Grobler.

Honours

Club

SuperSport United
 Nedbank Cup: 2016, 2017
 MTN 8: 2017, 2019
 Telkom Knockout Cup : 2014

Individual honours 

Lesley Manyathela Golden Boot : 2020-21

References

External links
 
 

1988 births
Afrikaner people
South African soccer players
Living people
Association football forwards
Platinum Stars F.C. players
Göztepe S.K. footballers
Cape Town Spurs F.C. players
Soccer players from Johannesburg
South African expatriate soccer players
South Africa international soccer players
Expatriate footballers in Turkey
SuperSport United F.C. players
Boksburg F.C. players